Many scientists have been recognized with the assignment of their names as international units by the International Committee for Weights and Measures or as non-SI units. The International System of Units (abbreviated SI from ) is the most widely used system of units of measurement. There are seven base units and 22 derived units (excluding compound units). These units are used both in science and in commerce. Two of the base SI units and 17 of the derived units are named after scientists. 28 non-SI units are named after scientists. By this convention, their names are immortalised. As a rule, the SI units are written in lowercase letters, but symbols of units derived from the name of a person begin with a capital letter.

Scientists and SI units 

(colour legend)

Scientists and non-SI units

See also 
List of people whose names are used in chemical element names
List of scientists whose names are used in physical constants

Notes

References

Bibliography

External links 
Physical dimensions of the units

SI units
S